is a railway station of Kyushu Railway Company located in is a railway station in Miyazaki City, Miyazaki Prefecture, Japan.

Lines

Layout 
The station, which is unstaffed, consists of an island platform serving two tracks set in a largely rural area with a view of the nearby Mizayaki Airport beyond some fields. There is no station building. A small shed beside the tracks on the access path serves as a waiting room. Access to the island platform from the path is by means of a level crossing with steps at the platform end.

Adjacent stations

History
The station closed when the Miyazaki Railway ceased operations on 1 July 1962. Subsequently, Japanese National Railways (JNR) extended its then Shibushi Line north from  towards Minami-Miyazaki on the same route and reopened Tayoshi as an intermediate station on 8 May 1963 but closed it on 1 October 1971.

Passenger statistics
In fiscal 2016, the station was used by an average of 37 passengers (boarding only) per day.

See also
List of railway stations in Japan

References

External links
Tayoshi (JR Kyushu)

Railway stations in Miyazaki Prefecture
Railway stations in Japan opened in 1913
Miyazaki (city)